Emma Hart (born 1974) is an English artist who works in a number of disciplines, including video art, installation art, sculpture, and film. She lives and works in London, where she is a lecturer at Slade School of Art.

In 2016, she was the winner of the Max Mara Art Prize for Women.

Early life and education
Hart studied Fine Art at Slade School of Fine Art, graduating with an MA in 2004, and completed a PhD in Fine Art in 2013 from Kingston University.

Career
Hart's art has been exhibited both in traditional gallery spaces and unconventional spaces such as "a semi-derelict flat above an abandoned frame-maker's shop" in Folkestone, as part of the 2014 Folkestone Triennial. Her artwork addresses questions of social class, familial behaviour, and the connections between relatives. Hart's initial training was in photography, but she has gradually focused more and more on sculptures using ceramics. She has also evoked her own life in her art: Dirty Looks, a 2013 exhibit at London's Camden Arts Centre, incorporated references to a job she once had working at a call center.

Upon winning the Max Mara Art Prize for Women in 2016, Hart embarked on a six-month-long residency in Italy, which was her first time spending more than three weeks outside of London.

A book accompanying her exhibit Banger at the Fruitmarket Gallery in Edinburgh included a short story by experimental fiction writer Ali Smith.

Exhibitions

Selected solo exhibitions 

 TO DO, Matt's Gallery, London, 28 September–20 November
 Dirty Looks, Camden Arts Centre, London 26 July - 29 September 2013
 Mamma Mia!, Whitechapel Gallery, London 12 July - 3 September 2017
 BANGER, The Fruitmarket Gallery, Edinburgh, 27 October 2018 - 3 February 2019

Selected group exhibitions 

 The World Turned Upside Down, Mead Gallery, Coventry, 2013
 Bloody English, OHWOW Gallery, Los Angeles, 2013
 Folkestone Triennial, 2014

References

1974 births
Living people
21st-century British women artists
Alumni of Kingston University
Alumni of the Slade School of Fine Art
Artists from London